The 2022–23 season is Western United (A-League Women)'s first season. It began on 19 November 2022 and will conclude on 1 April 2023 in the A-League Women.

Players

Transfers

Transfers in

Transfers out

Pre-season and friendlies

Competitions

A-League Women

League table

Results summary

Results by round

Matches

The league fixtures were announced on 15 September 2022.

Statistics

Appearances and goals

Players with no appearances not included in the list.

Disciplinary record

Clean sheets

Notes

References

Western United FC (A-League Women) seasons
Western United